The Leopard's Spots: A Romance of the White Man's Burden—1865–1900 is the first novel of Thomas Dixon's Reconstruction trilogy, and was followed by The Clansman: A Historical Romance of the Ku Klux Klan (1905), and The Traitor: A Story of the Fall of the Invisible Empire (1907). In the novel, published in 1902, Dixon offers an account of Reconstruction in which he portrays a Reconstruction leader (and former slave driver), Northern carpetbaggers, and emancipated slaves as the villains; Ku Klux Klan members are anti-heroes. While the playbills and program for The Birth of a Nation claimed The Leopard's Spots as a source in addition to The Clansman, recent scholars do not accept this.

The first half of a passage from the Book of Jeremiah (13:23) is included on the title page: "Can the Ethiopian change his skin, or the leopard his spots?" While the full passage is about evildoers refusing to turn away from evil to good, the title conveys the idea that, as leopards could not change their spots, people of African origin could not change what Dixon, as a racist and white supremacist, viewed as inherently negative character traits.

A reply to Uncle Tom's Cabin
Harriet Beecher Stowe's landmark novel of 1852, Uncle Tom's Cabin; or, Life Among the Lowly, had a profound effect on attitudes toward African Americans and slavery in the U.S. and is said to have "helped lay the groundwork for the Civil War". It was still widely read fifty years after its publication. According to Dixon, whose contact with the work was a dramatized version, Stowe "grossly misrepresent[ed]" the American South, and he felt her sympathetic portrayal of African Americans demanded revision. So as to make it clear he is answering Stowe, he presents his version of Stowe's characters, using Stowe's character names.

Characters

Leading characters of the story (as listed in the book) 
 Charles Gaston – A man who dreams of making it to the Governor's Mansion 
 Sallie Worth – A daughter of the old-fashioned South 
 Gen. Daniel Worth – Her father 
 Mrs. Worth – Sallie's mother 
 The Rev. John Durham – A preacher who threw his life away 
 Mrs. Durham – Of the Southern Army that never surrendered
 Tom Camp – A one-legged Confederate soldier 
 Flora – Tom's little daughter 
 Simon Legree – Ex-slave driver and Reconstruction leader 
 Allan Mcleod – A scalawag
 Hon. Everett Lowell – Member of Congress from Boston 
 Helen Lowell – His daughter 
 Miss Susan Walker – A maiden of Boston 
 Major Stuart Dameron – Chief of the Ku Klux Klan 
 Hose Norman – A dare-devil poor white man 
 Nelse – A black hero of the old régime
 Aunt Eve – His wife – "a respectable woman." 
 Hon. Tim Sheldby – Political boss of the new era 
 Hon. Pete Sawyer – Sold seven times, got the money once 
 George Harris, Jr. – An Educated Negro, son of Eliza 
 Dick – An unsolved riddle

Using names of characters in Uncle Tom's Cabin
 Simon Legree – In Uncle Tom's Cabin; a cruel master, hateful of religion, superstitious, and determined to “break” Tom 
 Tom Camp – In Stowe's novel Tom (no last name) is a humble African-American slave and "Mr. Shelby's best hand". Dixon's Tom is a former Confederate soldier, a poor white Christian whose family is victimized by black men.
 Hon. Tim Shelby – Political boss. In Uncle Tom's Cabin Arthur Shelby was Tom's owner, who "sold him South". His son George Shelby is also a character.
 George Harris, Jr – An educated negro

Dramatization
A dramatization by Dixon, with the same title, was produced in New York in 1913.

References

Further reading
 Bloomfield, Maxwell. "Dixon's "The Leopard's Spots": A Study in Popular Racism", American Quarterly,  Vol. 16, No. 3 (Autumn, 1964), pp. 387–401 in JSTOR, archived October 21, 2021, at the Wayback Machine.

External links
 Full text of The Leopard's Spots, Documenting the American South, University of North Carolina
 

1902 American novels
White supremacy in the United States
American political novels
Novels about the Ku Klux Klan
Doubleday, Page & Company books
Novels by Thomas Dixon Jr.
American novels adapted into films

Wilmington insurrection of 1898
Anti-Tom novels
Race-related controversies in literature
American novels adapted into plays